Robert Bruce McClanahan (born January 9, 1958) is an American former professional ice hockey player who played 224 games in the National Hockey League (NHL) for the Buffalo Sabres, Hartford Whalers and New York Rangers between 1980 and 1983. McClanahan was a member of the U.S. men's Olympic hockey team that beat the Soviet Union en route to a gold medal at Lake Placid in 1980.

Amateur and international career
McClanahan attended Mounds View High School and went on to play three seasons for the University of Minnesota, winning the 1979 NCAA national championship. After representing the US at the 1979 World Championship tournament in Moscow, McClanahan joined the US Olympic team on a full-time basis and scored 34 goals in 63 exhibition games. The culmination of McClanahan's amateur career came at the 1980 Olympics in Lake Placid, New York when he scored five goals in seven games while helping his country win the gold medal. He scored the winning goal in the gold medal game against Finland (which the U.S. came back to win 4–2) two days after the historic American victory over the Soviets.

During the opening game of the Olympic tournament against Sweden, McClanahan sustained a bruise on the upper thigh, which left the US team's roster short a second player, as teammate Jack O'Callahan had been injured during the exhibition game against the Soviet Union only three days prior to the Olympics. A now famous argument between McClanahan and Team USA's coach Herb Brooks during the intermission helped motivate McClanahan to return to the game and play through his injury, inspiring his team to a come-from-behind draw against Sweden that proved vital to achieving gold medal success later in the tournament.

Professional career
McClanahan was selected forty-ninth overall in the 1978 NHL Entry Draft by the Buffalo Sabres but did not begin playing with the Sabres until 1980, shortly after the Olympics. His NHL career was comparatively short-lived as he was mostly used as a role player. He bounced between the NHL and the American Hockey League and played part of the 1983/1984 season in the Central Hockey League with the Tulsa Oilers before finishing his NHL career under his old Olympic coach Herb Brooks with the New York Rangers in 1984 (he also represented the Hartford Whalers in 1981–82). During his professional career, McClanahan also was a member of Team USA at the 1981 Canada Cup.

Post-playing career
McClanahan became a financial broker after retirement, beginning his career with Morgan Stanley in 1985, then working for Bear Stearns and Piper Jaffray, where he was managing director. He joined the Minneapolis office of ThinkEquity Partners in March 2002 as Principal and became the company's Head of Trading.

He also was featured in American Dad! season 6 episode Return of the Bling.

McClanahan is currently the head coach of The Blake School boys varsity hockey team.

In popular culture
McClanahan was played by Nathan West in the 2004 Disney movie Miracle, which told the story of the 1980 U.S. Olympic gold medal win. West had been a goalie for the junior hockey team the Detroit Whalers in the Ontario Hockey League and has a tattoo of the National Hockey League logo on his arm.

In a 1981 TV movie about the same subject called Miracle on Ice, McClanahan is portrayed by Ken Stovitz.

Career statistics

Regular season and playoffs

International

References

External links
 
 Hockeydraftcentral bio

1958 births
Living people
1980 US Olympic ice hockey team
American men's ice hockey forwards
Binghamton Whalers players
Buffalo Sabres draft picks
Buffalo Sabres players
Hartford Whalers players
Ice hockey people from Saint Paul, Minnesota
Ice hockey players at the 1980 Winter Olympics
Medalists at the 1980 Winter Olympics
Minnesota Golden Gophers men's ice hockey players
New York Rangers players
Rochester Americans players
Olympic gold medalists for the United States in ice hockey
Springfield Indians players
Tulsa Oilers (1964–1984) players
NCAA men's ice hockey national champions